

List of Ministers of Employment (1977–2002)

List of Ministers of Employment, Industry, Trade and Tourism (2002–2003)

List of Ministers of Employment and Industry (2003–2006)

List of Ministers of Employment (since 2006)

External links
 Official site of the Ministry of Employment

Employment